Hayden Peak is a  mountain summit located in San Miguel County, in Colorado, United States. It is situated nine miles northwest of the community of Telluride, in the Mount Sneffels Wilderness, on land managed by Uncompahgre National Forest. It is part of the Sneffels Range which is a subset of the San Juan Mountains, which in turn is part of the Rocky Mountains. Hayden Peak is situated west of the Continental Divide, and three miles northwest of Mears Peak.

Etymology 

This mountain's name was officially adopted by the U.S. Board on Geographic Names to commemorate Ferdinand Vandeveer Hayden (1829–1887), an American geologist noted for his pioneering surveying expeditions of the Rocky Mountains. His survey team studied western Colorado from 1873 through 1876.

Climate 
According to the Köppen climate classification system, Hayden Peak is located in an alpine subarctic climate zone with long, cold, snowy winters, and cool to warm summers. Due to its altitude, it receives precipitation all year, as snow in winter, and as thunderstorms in summer, with a dry period in late spring. Precipitation runoff from the mountain drains into tributaries of the San Miguel River.

Gallery

See also

References

External links 

 Weather forecast: Hayden Peak

Mountains of San Miguel County, Colorado
San Juan Mountains (Colorado)
Mountains of Colorado
North American 3000 m summits
Uncompahgre National Forest